Nate Smith is an American country music singer signed to Sony Music Nashville. After his song "Wildfire" went viral on TikTok in 2020, he signed a publishing deal with Sony/ATV and gained prominence on social media before landing his major label record deal. He was previously signed to Word Records.

Early life and career 
Born and raised in Paradise, California, Smith was introduced to performing music by his church youth leader and cites Garth Brooks, Tom Petty, and Fleetwood Mac as his early influences. After moving to Nashville at age 23, he signed a record deal with Word Records and a publishing deal with Centricity Music. During this time, he opened for artists including Brett Eldredge, Eli Young Band, and X Ambassadors.

After returning to Paradise, California in 2018, Smith's home burned down in the Butte County Camp Fire. The tragedy inspired him to write his breakout song "One of These Days". News of the release was reported by local press and several national outlets including NPR, which encouraged Smith to return to Nashville and continue pursuing music.

After relocating, Smith released his next single "Wildfire". A clip of the performer singing his track went viral on the social media platform TikTok, gaining over 3 million views. A few months later, in November 2021, Smith signed a record deal with Sony Music Nashville and dropped his major label debut, "Raised Up", which he co-wrote with hit songwriter Jonathan Smith. He soon followed it with "I Don't Wanna Go to Heaven". The track helped land him on 2022 Artists to Watch lists by Country Now, Country Lifestyle Network and PopWrapped.

Discography

Studio albums

Singles

References 

American country singer-songwriters
Living people
Year of birth missing (living people)